The coins of the Austro-Hungarian krone were minted with a different design (but the same technical parameters) in Austria and Hungary.

Coins of Austria 
The Austrian coins were minted in Vienna, and came in face values of 1, 2, 10, and 20 heller; and 1, 2, 5, 10, 20, and 100 kronen. The Austrian 100-krone coin is still being minted, with a 1915 mint mark to enable Austrians to take advantage of a grandfather clause in the law regarding private ownership of gold bullion. It is a popular gold bullion coin similar to the Krugerrand.

Coins of Hungary 
The Hungarian coins were minted in the famous mint of Körmöcbánya (now Kremnica, Slovakia). Hungarian coins were minted with face values of 1, 2, 10 and 20 fillér; and 1, 2, 5, 10, 20 and 100 korona.

Remarks 
 "MAGYAR KIRÁLYI VÁLTÓPÉNZ" = "Hungarian royal token coin"
 "BIZALMAM AZ ŐSI ERÉNYBEN" = "My trust in the ancient virtue"
 "FERENCZ JÓZSEF I.K.A.CS. ÉS M.H.S.D.O.AP.KIR." = "Ferencz József Isten kegyelméből ausztriai császár és Magyar-, Horvát-, Szlavon-, Dalmátországok apostoli királya" = "Franz Joseph by the Grace of God Emperor of Austria and Apostolic King of Hungary, Croatia, Slavonia, Dalmatia"
 "HARCBAN ÉS BÉKÉBEN A NEMZETTEL A HAZÁÉRT" = "In battle and peace with the nation for the home"
 "KÁROLY I.K.A.CS. ÉS M.H.SZ.D.O.AP.KIR." = "Károly Isten kegyelméből ausztriai császár és Magyar-, Horvát-, Szlavon-, Dalmátországok apostoli királya" = "Charles by the Grace of God Emperor of Austria and Apostolic King of Hungary, Croatia, Slavonia, Dalmatia"
 "AZ EZERÉVES MAGYARORSZÁG EMLÉKÉRE" = "To the memory of the 1000-years-old Hungary"
 "MEGKORONÁZTATÁSÁNAK NEGYVENEDIK ÉVFORDULÓJÁRA 1867-1907" = "To the 40th anniversary of his [i.e. Franz Joseph I] coronation 1867-1907"

References

External links

 Review of 20 Austro-Hungarian Coronas (1892–1914)

Austria-Hungary